is a Japanese politician of the Liberal Democratic Party, a member of the House of Councillors in the Diet (national legislature). A native of Fukui, Fukui and graduate of the University of Tokyo, he joined the National Police Agency in 1961. Leaving the agency in 1992, he was elected to the House of Councillors for the first time in 1995.

References

External links 
  in Japanese.

Members of the House of Councillors (Japan)
University of Tokyo alumni
1938 births
Living people
Liberal Democratic Party (Japan) politicians
Politicians from Fukui Prefecture
People from Fukui (city)
21st-century Japanese politicians